EIMS may refer to:
 École internationale de Montréal (Secondaire), a high school in Westmount, Quebec, Canada
 Eudora Internet Mail Server

See also 
 EIM (disambiguation)